Dana Danilenko (Hebrew: דנה דנילנקו; born 19 July 2001) is an Israeli badminton player. She started playing badminton at the age of eight, and in 2011 she won the Israel Junior International tournament. Danilenko captured her first national championships title in 2016.

Achievements

BWF International Challenge/Series (3 runners-up) 
Women's singles

Women's doubles

  BWF International Challenge tournament
  BWF International Series tournament
  BWF Future Series tournament

References

External links 
 

2001 births
Living people
People from Lod
Israeli female badminton players
21st-century Israeli women